The India men's national under-18 basketball team, is controlled by the Basketball Federation of India and represents India in international under-18 (under age 18) basketball competitions.

Its best performance to date was 4th place at the 1972 Asian Basketball Under-18 Championship.

Competitive history

FIBA Under-19 Basketball World Cup
  1979 to  2023 : Did not qualify

FIBA Under-18 Asian Championship
  1970 : 5th
  1972 : 4th
  1977 : 15th
  1980 : 12th
  1982 : 10th
  1989 : 12th
  1990 : 11th
  1995 : 9th
  1996 : 13th
  1998 : 11th
  2000 : 12th
  2002 : 13th
  2004 : 17th
  2006 : 13th
  2008 : 13th
  2010 : 13th
  2012 : 10th
  2014 : 13th
  2016 : 8th
  2018 : 11th
  2022 : 9th

See also
India men's national basketball team
India men's national under-16 basketball team
India women's national under-18 basketball team

References

Men's national under-18 basketball teams
Under
Basketball